Visitors to Vietnam must obtain a visa from one of the Vietnamese diplomatic missions unless they come from one of the visa exempt countries or countries eligible for electronic visas. However, owing to the COVID-19 pandemic in Vietnam, the issuance of visas was temporarily suspended. On March 15, 2022, Vietnam reopened its borders and resumed its pre-pandemic entry and exit policies though 90 day visas (available pre-pandemic via consular offices worldwide) have remained unavailable.

Visa policy map

Visa exemption
Holders of normal passports issued by the following 25 countries do not require visas to visit Vietnam for up to the duration listed below:

Holders of Certificates of Visa Exemption do not require a visa regardless of nationality. A Certificate of Visa Exemption is valid for up to 5 years or up to 6 months before the passport expiration date (whichever is shorter). This is available for Vietnamese residing abroad or spouses or children of Vietnamese citizens or Vietnamese residing abroad.  The exemption is valid for up to 180 consecutive days of stay. There is no limit placed on the number of entries or exits during the stay or minimum waiting time needed in between each 180 days of stay.

Vietnam extended the visa free validity period for citizens of Belarus, Denmark, Finland, Japan, Norway, Russia, South Korea and Sweden through to 31 December 2022.

Citizens of China, Cuba and North Korea holding passports for public affairs or normal passports endorsed "for public affairs" do not require a visa for Vietnam.

Non-ordinary passports

Holders of diplomatic or service category passports of Afghanistan, Albania, Algeria, Angola, Argentina, Armenia, Azerbaijan, Bangladesh, Belarus, Bolivia, Brazil, Bulgaria, Chile, China, Colombia, Costa Rica, Côte d'Ivoire, Croatia, Cuba, Cyprus, Dominican Republic, Ecuador, Egypt, El Salvador, France, Germany, Hungary, India, Iraq, Italy, Japan, Kazakhstan, Kuwait, Mexico, Moldova, Mongolia, Montenegro, Morocco, Mozambique, Myanmar, Nepal, Nicaragua, North Korea, Pakistan, Panama, Paraguay, Peru, Philippines, Romania, Russia, Serbia, Seychelles, Singapore, Slovenia, South Africa, South Korea, Spain, Sri Lanka, Sudan, Tanzania, Tunisia, Turkey, Ukraine, United Arab Emirates, Uruguay, Venezuela, and holders of diplomatic passports only of Czech Republic, Estonia, Greece, Israel, Malta, Poland, Slovakia, Switzerland and Uzbekistan do not require a visa to visit Vietnam.

Visa waiver agreements for diplomatic and service passports were signed with the following countries but are not yet in effect:
 in December 2017
 in August 2018
 on 23 January 2019 (for diplomatic passport)
 on 19 Nov 2013
 in August 2019
 in October 2019

Phú Quốc Island
Travellers who are not exempted from visa requirements can visit Phú Quốc without a visa for up to 30 days. They must arrive at Phú Quốc directly from a third country, or from airports in Hanoi or Ho Chi Minh City where they will clear immigration and proceed to the domestic terminals.

Transit
Passengers of any nationality may transit through Vietnam by air without a visa for less than 24 hours providing that they do not intend to leave the sterile transit area. Staying overnight in the transit lounge is permitted.

E-visa

Vietnam has introduced a pilot electronic visa system on 1 February 2017 The e-visas have a cost of US$25 and are granted for single entry visits for up to 30 days to nationals of the following 82 eligible countries and territories:

1 – does not apply to e-passport holders.

Pre-arranged visa
Holders of a visa letter issued and stamped in Hanoi or Da Nang or Ho Chi Minh City by the Vietnamese Immigration Department within the Ministry of Public Security or the Consular Department of the Ministry of Foreign Affairs can obtain a visa for a maximum stay of 1 or 3 months at airports in Hanoi, Ho Chi Minh City, Da Nang, Phu Quoc,  Hai Phong, Da Lat  or Nha Trang.

APEC Business Travel Card

Holders of passports issued by the following countries who possess an APEC Business Travel Card (ABTC) containing "VNM" on the back of the card can enter visa-free for business trips for up to 60 days.

ABTCs are issued to nationals of:

Statistics
Most visitors arriving in Vietnam on short-term basis were from the following countries of nationality:

See also

Visa requirements for Vietnamese citizens

Notes

References

External links 
Vietnam e-visa application
List of Vietnamese diplomatic missions

Vietnam